Miribel station (French: Gare de Miribel) is a French railway station located in the commune of Miribel, Ain department in the Auvergne-Rhône-Alpes region. It is located at kilometric point (KP) 16.616 on the Lyon-Geneva railway, between Crépieux-la-Pape and Saint-Maurice-de-Beynost stations. Les Échets station, is also located in the Les Échets neighbourhood of the commune.

As of 2021, the station is owned and operated by the SNCF and served by TER Auvergne-Rhône-Alpes trains.

History 
The section of the Lyon–Geneva railway between Lyon and Ambérieu was opened on 23 June 1856.

In 2019, the SNCF estimated that 305,842 passengers traveled through the station.

Services

Passenger services 
Operated by the SNCF, the station still has an open passenger building with a passenger waiting room and automatic ticket machines.

Train services 
As of 2021, the station is served by the following services:

 Regional services (TER Auvergne-Rhône-Alpes 35) Chambéry ... Culoz ... Ambérieu ... Lyon.

Intermodality 

In addition to a parking lot for passengers, the station is equipped with secure bicycle storage facilities. Since February 2012, lines 1 and 2 of the Côtière liberté réseau intercommunal (Colibri) network serve the station.

Freight services 
Even though the station doesn't have any specialized tracks, the station is open to freight services.

References 

Railway stations in Ain
Lyon–Geneva railway